The Ilyushin Il-18 (NATO reporting name: Coot) is a large turboprop airliner that first flew in 1957 and became one of the best known and most durable Soviet aircraft of its era. The Il-18 was one of the world's principal airliners for several decades and was widely exported. Due to the aircraft's airframe durability, many examples achieved over 45,000 flight hours and the type remains operational in both military and (to a lesser extent) civilian capacities. The Il-18's successor was the long range Il-62 jet airliner.

Design and development
Two Soviet aircraft shared the designation Ilyushin Il-18. The first Il-18 was a propeller-driven airliner of 1946 but after a year of test flights that programme was abandoned.

In the early 1950s with a need to replace older designs and increase the size of the Soviet civil transport fleet, a Soviet Council of Ministers directive was issued on 30 December 1955 to the chief designers Kuznetsov and Ivchenko to develop new turboprop engines and to Ilyushin and Antonov to design an aircraft to use these engines. The two aircraft designs were developed as the Ilyushin Il-18 and the Antonov An-10 and the engine chosen was the Kuznetsov NK-4 rather than the Ivchenko AI-20.

The Il-18 design had started in 1954 before the directive was issued and experience with the piston-engined Il-18 was used although the aircraft was a new design. The design was for a four-engined low-wing monoplane with a circular pressurised fuselage and a conventional tail. The forward retracting tricycle landing gear had four wheels fitted on the main leg bogies, the main legs bogies rotated 90 degrees and retracted into the rear of the inboard engines. A new feature at the time was the fitting of a weather radar in the nose and it was the first Soviet airliner to have an automatic approach system.  The aircraft has two entry doors on the port-side before and after the wing and two overwing emergency exits on each side.

The prototype SSSR-L5811 was rolled out in June 1957 and after ground-testing it began taxi test and high-speed runs on 1 July 1957. On 4 July 1957 the prototype first flew from Khodynka. On 10 July 1957 the aircraft was flown to Moscow-Vnukovo Airport to be presented to a Soviet government commission; also present was the prototype Antonov An-10 and the Tupolev Tu-114. The Il-18 type was formally named Moskva and this was painted on the fuselage, although the name was not used when the aircraft entered production.

The Moscow Machinery Plant No. 30 located at Khodynka, near where the Ilyushin design office and the prototype had been built, was chosen to manufacture the aircraft. During 1957 the plant began to reduce its production of the Ilyushin Il-14 and prepare to build the production aircraft designated IL-18A. The Il-18A was only different from the prototype in minor details, mainly internal configuration to increase the seating from 75 to 89.

The first production aircraft were powered by the Kuznetsov NK-4 but the engines were plagued with problems so the Council of Ministers decreed in July 1958 that all production from November 1958 would use the Ivchenko AI-20 and earlier production would be re-engined. Only 20 IL-18As were built before production changed to the improved Il-18B, this new variant had a higher gross weight and the nose was re-designed with a larger radome which increased the length by 20 cm.  The first Il-18B flew on 30 September 1958 powered by the AI-20; a VIP variant was also built as the IL-18S for the Soviet Air Force. From April 1961 a TG-18 Auxiliary Power Unit was fitted for ground starting rather than the bank of lead-acid batteries. Some aircraft were modified to allow the APU to be run in flight.

With experience of the earlier aircraft a further improvement was the Il-18V variant. The Il-18V was structurally the same but the interior was re-designed including moving the galley and some minor system changes. The first Il-18V appeared in December 1959 and was to continue into production until 1965 after 334 had been built. Specialised variants of the aircraft also appeared, including aircraft modified for flight calibration and a long-range polar variant. Military variants also appeared including the anti-submarine Ilyushin Il-38.

Operational history

The first Il-18, initially equipped with Kuznetsov NK-4 engines, flew on 4 July 1957. On 17 September 1958 the aircraft first flew with the new Ivchenko AI-20 engines. Vladimir Kokkinaki was the test pilot. Between 1958 and 1960 twenty-five world records were set by this aircraft, among them flight range and altitude records with various payloads. In 1958 the aircraft was awarded the Brussels World Fair Grand Prix. In April 1979 a monument was unveiled at Sheremetyevo airport to commemorate the aircraft.

Seventeen foreign air carriers acquired some 125 Il-18 aircraft, seating 100-120 passengers. Il-18s are still in service in Siberia, North Korea and the Middle East, whilst a number of examples manufactured in the mid-1960s were still in civilian use in Africa and south Asia as at 2014. The type operates in various military capacities, including the Il-22PP electronic warfare and reconnaissance aircraft which entered service in October 2016. A modernized Il-20M with improved radar, radio and optical-electronic reconnaissance equipment entered service in July 2020 to provide secure targeting to Kh-47M2 Kinzhal missile system.

An Il-18 (registration DDR-STD) belonging to Interflug and used as a transport by East German leaders, including Erich Honecker, has been converted into a static hotel suite in The Netherlands.

As of July 2018, there are 7 aircraft in airliner service with 6 operators.

Variants

Data from:OKB Ilyushin
Il-18
 Designation of the sole prototype of the Il-18 family.
Il-18A
 The original production model, equivalent to pre-production, powered by either Kuznetsov NK-4 or Ivchenko AI-20 turboprop engines. Circa 20 built. 
Il-18B
 First major production model, a medium-haul airliner that could seat 84 passengers.
Il-18 Combi
Il-18 aircraft modified to mixed passenger / cargo configuration
Il-18D
 Similar to Il-18I, but equipped with an extra center section fuel tank for increased range. The Il-18D is fitted with four  Ivchenko AI-20M turboprop engines.
Il-18D communications relay
 Three aircraft modified to provide communications relay between VIP aircraft and Government bodies.
Il-18D Pomor
 A single Il-18D converted to a fisheries reconnaissance aircraft (Pomor = person who lives by the sea)
Il-18D Salon
 VIP version of the Il-18D
Il-18DORR
Two Il-18Ds modified as fishery reconnaissance aircraft for the Polar Institute of Oceanic Fishery and Oceanography, the modification mainly involved the fitment of specialized mission equipment. First flown in 1985 they were later modified back as standard Il-18Ds.
Il-18E
 Similar to the Il-18I, but without the increased fuel capacity.
Il-18E Salon
 VIP transport version of the Il-18E.
Il-18Gr
 Aircraft converted to cargo configuration, (Gr - Gruzovoy - cargo).
Il-18GrM
 Several Il-18 aircraft modified to Gr standard with the addition of a pressurised side cargo door.
Il-18I
Equipped with more powerful Ivchenko AI-20M turboprop engines, producing .
Il-18LL
(Letayuschchaya Laboratoriya - flying laboratory), one aircraft modified from an Il-18A to be an anti-icing test-bed and an Il-18V used by the Czechoslovak flight test center as an engine testbed.
Il-18RT
Two Il-18Vs were modified as Telemetry Relay Aircraft to rocket and unmanned air vehicle trials.
Il-18RTL
Prototype for Il-20RT, converted from Il-18A c/n 188000401.
Il-18S
VIP variant of Il-18B
Il-18SL
Designation of a number of different test and research aircraft, normally had a letter suffix like SL-18D for avionics trials.
Il-18T
 This designation was given to civil and military cargo transport aircraft converted from Il-18A/B/V aircraft.
Il-18AT: Military transport/medevac version based on the Il-18A
Il-18BT: Military transport/medevac version based on the Il-18B
Il-18VT: Military transport/medevac version based on the Il-18V
Il-18TD
One Il-18T was modified as a military transport variant to take either 69 stretcher cases or 118 paratroopers. Not wanted by the military it was converted to Il-18D standard.
Il-18USh
 One Il-18V was modified as a navigator trainer including two dorsal astro-sextant windows. Although it was tested and found acceptable the Soviet Air Force used a variant of the twin-jet Tupolev Tu-124 instead.
Il-18V
 Standard Aeroflot version, which entered service in 1961. The Il-18V was powered by four Ivchenko AI-20K turboprop engines, seating 90-100 passengers.
Il-18V Salon
 VIP version of the Il-18V
Il-18V/polar
 a single Il-18V modified for Polyarnaya Aviatsiya - Polar Aviation use.
Il-18V-26A
 a single Il-18V modified for Polyarnaya Aviatsiya - Polar Aviation use with an auxiliary fuel tank in the cabin, revised window layout and enlarged oil tanks on the engines, covered by protruding fairings on the engine nacelles (sometimes referred to as the Il-18D, before the real D model emerged).
Il-18V calibrator
 a single Il-18V operated by Interflug for navaid calibration.

Il-20M (NATO reporting name: Coot-A)
 COMINT/ELINT reconnaissance airplane version.

Il-20RT
 Four Telemetry aircraft used to support the Soviet space activities, later replaced by a variant of the Il-76.
Il-22 (NATO reporting name: Coot-B)
 Airborne command post version. (Not to be confused with 1947 prototype Soviet jet-engined bomber Il-22.)

Il-22M
 Same as the Il-22 but had new mission equipment.

Il-22PP
 Electronic warfare and reconnaissance aircraft
Il-24N
 Two Il-18Ds modified for ice reconnaissance similar to the Il-20M but with civilian reconnaissance equipment, both later modified back to standard configuration and sold.
Il-38
 Maritime reconnaissance, anti-submarine warfare version.
Il-118
A proposed upgrade powered by two Lotarev D-236-T propfan engines.

Operators

Civil operators

Current operators

Former operators

Military operators
Current operators:

Former operators:

Accidents and incidents

Specifications (Il-18D)

See also

Related development
 Ilyushin Il-38

Comparable aircraft
 Antonov An-10
 Bristol Britannia
 Canadair CL-44
 Lockheed L-188 Electra
 Vickers Vanguard
 Vickers Viscount

Related lists
 List of civil aircraft

References

Notes

Bibliography

Gordon, Yefim and Komissarov, Dmitry. Ilyushin Il-18/-20/-22 - A Versatile Turboprop Transport. Hinckley, Leicestershire, UK: Midland Publishing, 2004,

External links

Flight simulator Il-18 in the Museum of Technology "Hugo Junkers" in Dessau (Germany)
Ilyushin Il-18 Coot

Il-018
1950s Soviet airliners
Four-engined tractor aircraft
Low-wing aircraft
Four-engined turboprop aircraft
Aircraft first flown in 1957
Soviet and Russian military reconnaissance aircraft
Electronic warfare aircraft